General elections were held in Belgium on 26 March 1961. The result was a victory for the Christian Social Party, which won 96 of the 212 seats in the Chamber of Representatives and 47 of the 106 seats in the Senate. Voter turnout was 92.3%. Elections for the nine provincial councils were also held.

Prior to the elections, the centre-right government of the Christian Social and Liberal Party led by Gaston Eyskens pushed through austerity measures with a law known as the Eenheidswet or Loi Unique, despite heavy strikes in the preceding weeks, especially in Wallonia. After the elections, the Christian Democrats formed a new government with the Socialist Party instead of the Liberal Party, with Théo Lefèvre as Prime Minister.

Results

Chamber of Deputies

Senate

References

1961 elections in Belgium
March 1961 events in Europe